Point of View is the debut studio album by American jazz singer Cassandra Wilson, recorded in Brooklyn, New York, in December 1985, as the fourth release of the German JMT label in 1986. It was also one of the first albums of a group of musicians around Steve Coleman, that became known as M-Base.

Reception

Writing for Allmusic on the occasion of the albums reissue on Winter & Winter in 2001, Scott Yanow gave the album a star rating of four out of five and praised Wilson's effort to "find a role for her voice" among "overcrowded ensembles". He described Wilson as a "chance-taking singer in a funky M-Base setting."

Track listing
 "Square Roots" (Cassandra Wilson) – 4:39
 "Blue in Green" (Miles Davis, Bill Evans, Wilson) – 4:10
 "Never" (Steve Coleman, Wilson) – 4:41
 "Desperate Move" (Coleman) – 7:58
 "Love & Hate" (Grachan Moncur III) – 8:19
 "I Am Waiting" (Wilson) – 3:39
 "I Wished on the Moon" (Dorothy Parker, Ralph Rainger) – 3:35
 "I Thought You Knew" (Jean-Paul Bourelly) – 5:36

Personnel
Band
Cassandra Wilson – vocals, guitar
Grachan Moncur III – trombone
Steve Coleman – alto saxophone, percussion
Jean-Paul Bourelly – electric guitar
Lonnie Plaxico – electric and acoustic bass
Mark Johnson – drums

Production
Stefan F. Winter – producer
Steve Coleman – producer
Joe Marciano – engineer
Adrian Von Ripka – mastering
Christine Paxmann;– cover design
Scott Sternbach – photography
Günter Mattei – cover design for the reissue 
Joseph Gasu Rittenberg – photography for the reissue

References

1986 debut albums
Cassandra Wilson albums
JMT Records albums
Winter & Winter Records albums